This is a list of types of threaded fasteners, including both screws and bolts.


Fasteners with a tapered shank

Fasteners with a non-tapered shank

References

Bibliography

Screws
Threaded fasteners